The Museo Nacional de Bellas Artes ("National Museum of Fine Arts") is an Argentine art museum in Buenos Aires, located in the Recoleta section of the city. The Museum inaugurated a branch in Neuquén in 2004. The museum hosts works by Goya, Rembrandt, Van Gogh, Rodin, Manet and Chagall among other artists.

History

Argentine painter and art critic Eduardo Schiaffino, was the first director of the museum, which opened on 25 December 1895, in a building on Florida Street that today houses the Galerías Pacífico shopping mall. In 1909, the museum moved to a building in Plaza San Martín, originally erected in Paris as the Argentine Pavilion for the 1889 Paris exhibition, and later dismantled and brought to Buenos Aires. In its new home, the museum became part of the International Centenary Exhibition held in Buenos Aires in 1910. Following the demolition of the pavilion in 1932, as part of the remodeling of Plaza San Martín, the museum was transferred to its present location in 194
3, a building originally constructed in 1870 as a drainage pumping station and adapted to its current use by architect Alejandro Bustillo.

The museum was modernized both physically and in its collections during the 1955–64 tenure of director Jorge Romero Brest. A temporary exhibits pavilion opened in 1961, and the museum acquired a large volume of modern art though its collaboration with the Torcuato di Tella Institute, a leading promoter of local, avant-garde artists, and elsewhere; a contemporary Argentine art pavilion opened in 1980. This  hall is the largest of 34 currently in use at the museum, which totals  of exhibit space. Its permanent collection totals 688 major works and over 12,000 sketches, fragments, potteries, and other minor works. The institution also maintains a specialized library, totaling 150,000 volumes, as well as a public auditorium. The museum commissioned architect Mario Roberto Álvarez to design a branch in the Patagonian region city of Neuquén. Inaugurated in 2004, this museum has four exhibit halls totaling  and a permanent collection of 215 works, as well as temporary exhibits and a public auditorium.

The ground floor of the museum holds 24 exhibit halls housing a fine international collection of paintings from the Middle Ages up to the 20th century, together with the museum's art history library. The first floor's eight exhibit halls contain a collection of paintings by some of the most important 20th-century Argentine painters, including Antonio Berni, Ernesto de la Cárcova, Benito Quinquela Martín, Eduardo Sívori, Sarah Grilo, Alfredo Guttero, Raquel Forner, Xul Solar, Marcelo Pombo and Lino Enea Spilimbergo. The second floor's two halls, completed in 1984, hold an exhibition of photographs and two sculpture terraces, as well as most of the institution's administrative and technical departments.

Gallery

External links
 
 Asociación Amigos Museo Nacional de Bellas Artes 
Virtual tour of the Museo Nacional de Bellas Artes provided by Google Arts & Culture

Museums in Buenos Aires
Art museums and galleries in Argentina
Buildings and structures completed in 1933
Bellas Artes, Buenos Aires
Art museums established in 1895
1895 establishments in Argentina